Key 10th Memorial Fes Anniversary CD  is remix album released on February 28, 2009 in Japan by Key Sounds Label bearing the catalog numbers KSLC-0004—0005. It was released at Key 10th Memorial Fes, an event hosted by the visual novel development brand Key under VisualArt's and held during February 28 and March 1, 2009 to commemorate the tenth anniversary of the game brand's establishment. The album contains two discs with sixteen tracks, though only the music on the first disc is of new remixes of music from Key's visual novels. The second disc re-uses older remixes previously released by Key Sounds Label on the albums Recollections and Ornithopter; tracks one through six are from the former, and the remaining tracks are from the latter. The tracks on the album were composed, arranged, and produced by Jun Maeda, Shinji Orito, Magome Togoshi, Takumaru, Manack, Manyo, and PMMK.

Track listing

References

External links
Key Sounds Label's official website 

2009 compilation albums
Key Sounds Label